Compañero Augusto is a 1976 Venezuelan film directed by Enver Cordido. It stars Orlando Urdaneta, María Grazia Bianchi, Rafael Cabrera, Jesús Maella, Julio Mota, and Chelo Rodríguez.

Plot 
Augusto Cárdenas is a former guerrilla fighter from a high-class family in Caracas who is released after four years in prison. He is reunited with his parents and wife. He returns to his city world, enjoying the luxuries that money brings him. His political ideals and the promises of struggle he made to his fellow combatants remain in memory.

References

External links 
 Compañero Augusto at FilmAffinity
 
 

1976 films
1970s Spanish-language films
Venezuelan drama films
1976 drama films